Gangal may refer to:
 Gangal (Attock)
 Gangal (Rawalpindi)
 Gangal (Jhelum)